Darren Bourke (born 25 March 1970) is a former Australian rules footballer who played with St Kilda in the Australian Football League (AFL).

Bourke appeared in under-19s and reserves football for Melbourne in the late 1980s. His father, Barry Bourke, had played for the club. St Kilda selected him at pick 60 in the 1993 Pre-season Draft, from Dandenong. A midfielder, Bourke averaged 20 disposals a game in his debut season, from his 14 appearances. He earned the maximum three Brownlow Medal votes in just his third game, against the Sydney Swans at Waverley Park.

References

1970 births
Australian rules footballers from Victoria (Australia)
St Kilda Football Club players
Dandenong Football Club players
Living people